Tobeen (Bordeaux, July 20, 1880 - Saint-Valery-sur-Somme, March 1938) is the pseudonym of the French artist Félix Bonnet.

Life
Tobeen stayed frequently in the western part of thé Pyrenees, Basque Country, but was born and bred in Bordeaux. Because of his frequent reference to Basque subjects within his paintings he became known as a Basque artist. However, he was not a Basque and neither were his parents.

From 1910 he worked in Paris where he maintained relations with the group of Pablo Picasso and Georges Braque and with the group of the Duchamp brothers (Gaston, Raymond and Marcel) in Puteaux. He exhibited eleven works at the Salon de la Section d'Or, Galerie La Boétie, Paris, October 1912.

But Tobeen was not a city-dweller. He loved a life of liberty, the sea, the woods and after 1920 he settled in Saint-Valery-sur-Somme.
Tobeen's paintings, drawings and woodcarvings show the traces of his Parisian period and his passion for the poetry in human life.

Exhibitions
 Salon de la Section d'Or, Galerie La Boétie (Paris), 1912
 Armory Show (New York), 1913
 Mánes Union of Fine Arts, Mánes Pavilion, (S.V.U. Manes), Prague, 1914
 Tobeen, un poète du cubisme: Bordeaux, Galerie Musée des Beaux Arts, 2012 June 8 - September 16

Museum collections
The Netherlands
 Centraal Museum, Utrecht
 Kröller-Müller Museum, Otterlo
 In former times Scheringa Museum of Realist Art, Spanbroek

France
 , Bayonne
 Musée des beaux-arts de Bordeaux, Bordeaux
 Musées Menton, collection Wakefield, Menton
 Musée des Beaux-Arts de Nancy, Nancy

References
 
3.Tobeen, un moderne chez les Basques, biography by Goikoetxea Jean Paul, ed. Pimientos, 2012.

External links

 Tobeen.org
 Inscription au catalogue raisonné Tobeen Richard/Goiko 
 tobeen-biographie-alarme : https://sites.google.com/site/tobeenbiographie/ [archive]

19th-century French painters
French male painters
20th-century French painters
Cubism
1880 births
1938 deaths
19th-century French male artists